Edomite was a Northwest Semitic Canaanite language, very similar to Biblical Hebrew, Ekronite, Ammonite, Phoenician, Amorite and Sutean, spoken by the Edomites in southwestern Jordan and parts of Israel in the 2nd and 1st millennium BCE. It is extinct and known only from a very small corpus. It is attested in a scant number of impression seals, ostraca, and a single late 7th or early 6th century BCE letter, discovered in Horvat Uza.

Like Moabite, but unlike Hebrew, it retained the feminine ending -t in the singular absolute state. In early times, it seems to have been written with a Phoenician alphabet. However, by the 6th century BCE, it adopted the Aramaic alphabet. Meanwhile, Aramaic or Arabic features such as whb ("gave") and tgr ("merchant") entered the language, with whb becoming especially common in proper names. Like many other Canaanite languages, Edomite features a prefixed definite article derived from the presentative particle (h-ʔkl ‘the food’). The diphthong /aw/ contracted to /o/ between the 7th and 5th century BCE, as foreign transcriptions of the divine name "Qos" indicate a transition in pronunciation from Qāws to Qôs.

Examples

References

Canaanite languages
Edom
Languages attested from the 1st millennium BC
Languages extinct in the 6th century BC